Highway 58 is an oiled surface provincial highway in the Canadian province of Saskatchewan which handles approximately 100 vehicles per day. It runs from Highway 18 3 kilometres west of Fir Mountain until Highway 1 / Highway 19 near Chaplin in the south-central area of the province.

The highway's passage through the province offers a diverse sample of Saskatchewan to a traveller, taking in rural villages and towns, the scenery of the Missouri Coteau, Thomson Lake which is a man-made lake for recreational and reservoir purposes, natural lakes such as Chaplin Lake which is the second largest saline lake in Canada. The terrain of the Missouri Coteau features low hummocky, undulating, rolling hills, potholes, and grasslands. This physiographic region of Saskatchewan is the uplands Missouri Coteau, a part of the Great Plains Province or Alberta Plateau Region which extends across the south-east corner of the province of Saskatchewan. Highway 58 runs through the first regional park of Saskatchewan; Thomson Lake Regional Park, and also provides nearby access to Shamrock Regional Park another early regional park of Saskatchewan. The Louis Pierre Gravel National Historic Marker commemorates history at the north end of Highway 58, and the Cripple Creek Provincial Historic Marker is located at the south end. Highway 58 also provides access to the Chaplin / Old Wives / Reed Lakes Western Hemisphere Shorebird Reserve Network, a shorebird sanctuary of international repute and fame.

Communities 

The Wood Mountain First Nations Indian Reserve is located near Fir Mountain and is south of the southern terminus of Highway 58. Historically Sioux Indians traversed this area as they followed Chief Sitting Bull.
37.2 kilometres north is Lafleche first called Buffalo Head. Lafleche is located near Thomson Lake and became a town in 1953. The CPR line came through, in 1913. Mail delivery arrived via train, however this switched to mail truck in 1958. Travelling a distance of 57.8 kilometres is the town of Gravelbourg which is noted for being the Cultural Gem of Saskatchewan. Gravelbourg features the Our Lady of Assumption Roman Catholic Co-Cathedral and at one time was a bustling agricultural centre and hosted nine agricultural elevators.
Shamrock Regional Park is south east of Shamrock. 98.5 kilometres from the southern terminus is the village of Shamrock. Travelling 135 kilometres to the northern terminus of Highway 58 is Chaplin. A major attraction for bird watchers is the Chaplin Shorebird Site at Chaplin Lake. Approaching this town, there is a large American avocet statue beside the road in tribute to the many bird watching sanctuaries. Chaplin is home to diverse industry such as a shrimp processing plant, sodium sulphate mining and pulse and oilseed agriculture.

The highway passes through five rural municipalities, including Waverley No. 44, Wood River No. 74, Gravelbourg No. 104, Shamrock No. 134, and Chaplin No. 164.

History 
The rural municipalities (RM) were created to provide a civic government to rural residents, such as police, health, and fire protection, education, as well as bridge and road maintenance and construction. The early roads in Saskatchewan began as dirt roads along the township and range roads surveyed by the Dominion Government land surveyors around homestead allotments. Two and four horse teams would plough and grade these roads before graders and scrapers were bought by the various rural municipalities. The RMs would also hire crews to maintain the road ditches, and keep the roads clear of snow during the winter months. Joint funding with the provincial government and RMs provided oil surfacing and asphalt highway surfaces.

Attractions 

National Historic Site, Louis Pierre Gravel honours the arrival of the abbot Louis-Pierre Gravel, a missionary-colonizer and the Franco-Americans  who settled Gravelbourg. The memorial site is located south of Highway 43 and just east of Highway 58.

Thomson Lake Regional Park, a man-made lake along Highway 58 near Lafleche, is 81 hectares (200 acres) in size and hosts swimming lessons, camping, picnicking, boating, and golf. Thomson Lake was created in 1958 by Dr Thomson as a reservoir for Lafleche and Gravelbourg creating water resources in the dry, desert-like area historically known as the Palliser Triangle. Thomson Lake Regional Park became the first regional park in the province of Saskatchewan.

Notukeu Creek is traversed by Highway 58.

Chaplin Lake is a saline lake which has an area of 52 kilometres squared (20 mi2), making it the second largest saline lake in Canada. is a haven for many varieties of shorebirds. The Chaplin, Old Wives, and Reed Lake complex is a site in the Western Hemisphere Shorebird Reserve Network, and was dedicated as having global importance in May 1997.  This was followed by recognition as a globally significant Important Bird Area in 1999. The endangered species of piping plovers find sanctuary here as well. Saskatchewan Heritage Marsh is located at the south end of Chaplin Lake where sanderling, stilt sandpiper, American avocet, semipalmated and Baird's sandpiper, killdeer, long-billed curlew, marbled godwit, and dowitcher can be often seen in the spring.

Provincial Historic Site Cripple Creek provincial historic marker is located at the junction of Highway 13 and Highway 58.  Cripple Creek Crossing - North-West Mounted Police Camp Site is a municipal heritage site. This area encompasses 128 hectares and commemorates the history of the "March West" of the North-West Mounted Police under the command of George Arthur French on July 8, 1874.

Major intersections 
From south to north:

References

External links 

Saskatchewan Highways Website—Highway Numbering
Saskatchewan Road Map RV Itineraries
Big Things of Canada, A Celebration of Community Monuments of Canada

058